Bellevue is a historic home located near Goode, Bedford County, Virginia. The main house was built in three phases between about 1824 and 1870. It is a two-story, five bay, brick dwelling in the Federal style.  It has a central hall plan, hipped roof, and two frame wings. Also on the property are a contributing school dormitory building known as Inkstand, as well as three dependencies, a garden, and a family cemetery. After the American Civil War, the house was altered to function as a high school for boys established by James Philemon Holcombe (1820–1873).  It functioned into the late-19th century.

It was listed on the National Register of Historic Places in 1990.  It is located in the Bellevue Rural Historic District.

References

Houses on the National Register of Historic Places in Virginia
Federal architecture in Virginia
Houses completed in 1870
Houses in Bedford County, Virginia
National Register of Historic Places in Bedford County, Virginia
Individually listed contributing properties to historic districts on the National Register in Virginia
1870 establishments in Virginia